Y que patatín...y que patatán is a 1971 Argentine comedy film directed and written by Mario Sábato in collaboration with Mario Mactas. The film stars Juan Sabato, Sergio Renán, Julia von Grolman and Fernando Siro.

The film premiered on 30 September 1971 in Buenos Aires. It was exhibited at the Venice International Film Festival in 1971.

Plot
Five episodes depict children in extreme situations, taking a raw look at their childhood.

Cast 
  Juan Sabato
  Sergio Renán
  Julia von Grolman
  Fernando Siro
  Héctor Alterio
  Cipe Lincovsky
  Walter Vidarte
  Walter Santa Ana
  Elena Cruz
  Héctor Calcaño

Reception
Agustín Mahieu said in La Opinión: A recommended film showing children as an oppressed class. The set is an uneven work ... but fascinating, undoubtedly original. The irony, roughness and sensitivity that Sabato reflects in his vision of childhood is probably his greatest merit". Panorama noted its "mesh of close-ups and detail shots that frequently isolate the protagonist", capturing an "abstract childhood, burdened by the camera and the circumstances of the story". Manrupe and Portela wrote: "Irregular in the formal, valuable in its approach to the children's world and its problems".

References

External links 
 

1971 films
1970s Spanish-language films
1971 comedy films
Argentine comedy films
Films directed by Mario Sábato
1970s Argentine films